Exosome component 3, also known as EXOSC3, is a human gene, which is part of the exosome complex.

Clinical significance 

Mutations in EXOSC3 cause pontocerebellar hypoplasia and spinal motor neuron degeneration.

References

Further reading

External links